Orizari is a town in the municipality of Gjorče Petrov, North Macedonia.

Demographics
According to the 2002 census, the town had a total of 15637 inhabitants. Ethnic groups in the town include:

Macedonians 13394
Serbs 534 
Bosniaks 429
Albanians 346
Turks 303
Romani 279
Vlachs 48
Others 304

References

External links

Villages in Ǵorče Petrov Municipality
Albanian communities in North Macedonia